Hortensius is a small, bowl-shaped lunar impact crater that is located in the northern part of the Mare Insularum. It was named after 17th century Dutch astronomer Martin van den Hove (Latinized as Martinus Hortensius). 
It lies some distance to the west-southwest of the prominent crater Copernicus. Hortensius is circular and cup-shaped, with a small floor at the midpoint of the sloping interior walls. The interior has a higher albedo than the surrounding lunar mare, despite traces of ray material from Copernicus.

To the north of this feature is a collection of six lunar domes, many having a tiny craterlet at the summit. These are shield volcanoes that were formed by a highly viscous type of lava. The domes are generally circular in form, with a diameter of 6–8 kilometers (4–5 mi), and rising as high as 400 meters (1300 ft). They are formed of the same material as the surrounding mare, although from a different process.

Satellite craters
By convention these features are identified on lunar maps by placing the letter on the side of the crater midpoint that is closest to Hortensius.

References

 
 
 
 
 
 
 
 
 
 
 

Impact craters on the Moon